Plebanka may refer to the following places:
Plebanka, Gmina Aleksandrów Kujawski in Kuyavian-Pomeranian Voivodeship (north-central Poland)
Plebanka, Gmina Waganiec in Kuyavian-Pomeranian Voivodeship (north-central Poland)
Plebanka, Radziejów County in Kuyavian-Pomeranian Voivodeship (north-central Poland)
Plebanka, Wąbrzeźno County in Kuyavian-Pomeranian Voivodeship (north-central Poland)
Plebanka, Lublin Voivodeship (east Poland)
Plebanka, Masovian Voivodeship (east-central Poland)